Stewartstown may refer to:

United Kingdom
Stewartstown, County Tyrone, a village in Northern Ireland
Stewartstown Harps GFC, a GAA club
Stewartstown railway station, a disused Great Northern Railway station
Stewartstown, Belfast, a city council ward in the Collin electoral district

United States
Stewartstown, New Hampshire
Stewartstown, Pennsylvania
Stewartstown Railroad, a heritage railroad
Stewartstown Engine House, Stewartstown Railroad, a historic railroad engine house
Stewartstown station (Pennsylvania), a historic railroad station
Stewartstown, West Virginia